The dusky lark (Pinarocorys nigricans), also known as the dusky bush lark or rufous-rumped bush lark, is a species of migratory lark in the family Alaudidae. It is native to the southern Afrotropics.

Range
It is found in southern Central Africa; it is a summer migrant to more southerly areas. Its natural habitats are dry savannah and subtropical or tropical dry lowland grassland.

Taxonomy and systematics
Formerly, the dusky lark was classified as belonging to the genera Alauda and Mirafra until moved to Pinarocorys.

Subspecies 
Two subspecies are recognized: 
 P. n. nigricans (Sundevall, 1850): Found in south-eastern DR Congo, north-western Zambia and south-western Tanzania
 P. n. occidentis Clancey, 1968: Found in south-western DR Congo and northern Angola

References

dusky lark
Birds of Central Africa
dusky lark
Taxonomy articles created by Polbot